Isaacs Creek is a stream in Ripley County in the U.S. state of Missouri. It is a tributary of the Current River.

It flows to the southwest entering the Mark Twain National Forest and then turns to the south and flows roughly parallel to Missouri Route Y. It crosses under Route Y and enters the Current at  approximately 2.5 miles northwest of Doniphan and an elevation of 341 feet.

Isaacs Creek has the name of Isaac Payne, an early citizen.

See also
List of rivers of Missouri

References

Rivers of Ripley County, Missouri
Rivers of Missouri